Pseudomogoplistes squamiger, the scaly cricket, is a species of apterous cricket in the family Mogoplistidae.  Long known in the genus Mogoplistes it was placed this genus, for which it became the type species, by AV Gorochov in 1984.

Habitat and Distribution
Usually found near the sea on pebble beaches, its native range is especially in southern Europe and northern Africa, but since the 1960s it has been recorded from Dorset, later found in Devon in the British Isles

References

See also
 iNaturalist: image as the "Mediterranean Beach-Cricket"
 List of Orthoptera and allied insects of Great Britain

Crickets
Insects described in 1853